Ochiltree County is a county located in the panhandle of the U.S. state of Texas. As of the 2020 census, its population was 10,015. The county seat is Perryton. The county was created in 1876 and organized in 1889. and is named for William Beck Ochiltree, who was an attorney general of the Republic of Texas. It was previously one of 30 prohibition or entirely dry counties in the state of Texas.

Geography

Major highways
  U.S. Highway 83
  State Highway 15
  State Highway 70

Adjacent counties
 Texas County, Oklahoma (north)
 Beaver County, Oklahoma (northeast)
 Lipscomb County (east)
 Roberts County (south)
 Hansford County (west)
 Hemphill County (southeast)

Demographics

Note: the US Census treats Hispanic/Latino as an ethnic category. This table excludes Latinos from the racial categories and assigns them to a separate category. Hispanics/Latinos can be of any race.

As of the census of 2000, 9,006 people, 3,261 households, and 2,488 families were residing in the county.  The population density was 10 people per square mile (4/km2).  The 3,769 housing units averaged 4 per square mile (2/km2).  The racial makeup of the county was 86.2% White, 0.13% African American, 0.94% Native American, 0.39% Asian,  10.29% from other races, and 2.04% from two or more races. About 13.79% of the population were Hispanics or Latinos of any race. In terms of ancestry, 11.3% were of German, 10.3% were of Irish, 6.3% were of English, 5.4% were of American, and 1.5% were of Dutch, 1.5% were of Polish.

Of the 3,261 households,  40.9% had children under the age of 18, 64% were married couples living together, 7.9% had a female householder with no husband present, and 23.7% were not families.  About 21% of all households were made up of individuals, and 9.30% had someone living alone who was 65 years of age or older.  The average household size was 2.74, and the average family size was 3.18.

In the county, the population distribution was 30.6% under the age of 18, 8.4% from 18 to 24, 28.7% from 25 to 44, 20.7% from 45 to 64, and 11.7% who were 65 years of age or older.  The median age was 34 years. For every 100 females, there were 99.8 males.  For every 100 females age 18 and over, there were 96.9 males.

The median income for a household was $38,013, and for a family was $45,565. Males had a median income of $31,558 versus $19,890. The per capita income for the county was $16,707.  About 13% of the population and 9.8% of families were below the poverty line; 17.9% of those under the age of 18 and 8.7% of those 65 and older were living below the poverty line.

Those making less than $25,000 per year comprised 32.2% of the population, while 1.9% made more than $150,000, according to the 2000 census. Around 17.5% of the population made less than $15,000 per year, while 6.06% made more than $100,000.

Politics
Since the 1950s, Ochiltree has been an overwhelmingly Republican county. The last Democrat to carry the county was Harry S. Truman in 1948; Truman won 73.06% of the county's vote, more than twice the percentage any Democratic candidate has won in the subsequent 17 presidential elections. Even Texan Lyndon Johnson did not reach 35% in his 1964 landslide, when Ochiltree was easily Goldwater’s strongest Texas county. Indeed, Jimmy Carter in 1976 was the last Democrat to win 20% of the county’s vote, and the last to reach so much as 10% was Bill Clinton in 1996.

In 2004 in Ochiltree County, 92.0% of voters (2,922) voted for George W. Bush, while 7.9% (251 people) voted for John Kerry. Two people voted for Michael Badnarik (Libertarian). This is tied for the second-highest percentage of votes Bush received for any county in the US (in both 2000 and 2004), and it is the highest percentage during the 2004 election, (only Glasscock County, Texas, at 93.1%, had a higher percentage in the 2000 Presidential election).

In 2008, 91.7% of voters supported Senator John McCain, whereas only 7.8% of voters supported Senator Barack Obama. Presidential elections indicate strong support for the Republican party. It lost the title of most Republican county in the United States to Roberts County, Texas.

Education
Of the population aged 25 and older (5,441 people), 14.6% did not have a high-school diploma, while 12.9% statewide are without a high-school diploma. About 27% of the county claimed that a high-school diploma was their highest level of educational attainment, compared with 24.8% statewide; 16.1% had a bachelor's degree or higher, compared with 23.2% statewide.

The Allen campus of Frank Phillips College is located in Perryton.

Communities

City
 Perryton (county seat)

Town
 Booker (mostly in Lipscomb County)

Unincorporated communities
 Farnsworth
 Waka

In popular culture
Ochiltree County is the setting for the Hank the Cowdog series of children's books, in the unincorporated city of Twitchell.

See also 

 Dry counties
 List of museums in the Texas Panhandle
 National Register of Historic Places listings in Ochiltree County, Texas
 Recorded Texas Historic Landmarks in Ochiltree County

References

External links
 Ochiltree County government’s website
 Ochiltree County in Handbook of Texas Online at the University of Texas
 Ochiltree County Profile from the Texas Association of Counties

 
1889 establishments in Texas
Populated places established in 1889
Texas Panhandle